Amauroclopius is a small genus of assassin bugs belonging to the family Reduviidae.

The genus consists of two described species, both of which are found in South America.

Partial species list

Amauroclopius ornatus Distant, 1903
Amauroclopius bispinus Stål, 1868

External links 

Reduviidae
Cimicomorpha genera
Insects of South America